Edwin Hobhouse Sircom (1815 – 9 December 1893) was an English organist and composer.

Background

He was born in 1815, the second son of John Sircom and Jane Freeman Lewis.

He married Ann Ford, daughter of James Groom Ford, on 5 April 1842. They had the following children:
Sebastian Ford Sircom (1844 – 1934)
Edwin Sircom (b. 1845)
Emily Fanny Sircom (b. 4 Feb 1848)
Agnes Maria Sircom (b. 11 Mar 1851)
Felix Mendelssohn Sircom (b. 1 Nov 1851)
George Henry Sircom (b. 15 Mar 1853)
Louis William Crossman Sircom (b. 1856)

Appointments

Organist at St Mary Redcliffe, Bristol 1840 – 1855
Organist at St. Mary's Catholic Church on the Quay, Bristol 1859 - ????
Organist at St. James' Church, Bristol 1863 - ????
Organist at Stonyhurst College

Compositions

He composed accompaniments for Vespers.

References

1815 births
1893 deaths
English organists
British male organists
English composers
Converts to Roman Catholicism from Anglicanism
19th-century British composers
19th-century English musicians
19th-century British male musicians
19th-century organists